Jennifer Zietz (born 14 September 1983) is a German retired football player. She has also been capped for the German national team.

Zietz led Turbine Potsdam to a victory over Brøndby in the 2009–10 UEFA Women's Champions League Round of 16.

She retired at the end of the 2014–15 season.

Honours
Turbine Potsdam
 UEFA Women's Cup/UEFA Women's Champions League: 2005, 2010
 Fußball-Bundesliga (women): 2003–04, 2005–06, 2008–09, 2009–10, 2010–11, 2011–12
 DFB Pokal: 2004, 2005, 2006
 DFB-Hallenpokal: 2004, 2005, 2008, 2009, 2010, 2013, 2014

Germany
UEFA Women's Championship: Winner 2009

Individual
One Club Award: 2022

References

1983 births
Living people
German women's footballers
Germany women's international footballers
1. FFC Turbine Potsdam players
Sportspeople from Rostock
UEFA Women's Championship-winning players
Women's association football midfielders
Footballers from Mecklenburg-Western Pomerania